The 2022–23 season is the 146th season in the existence of Crewe Alexandra Football Club and the club's first season back in League Two since the 2019–20 season following relegation in the previous season. In addition to the league, they will also compete in the 2022–23 FA Cup, the 2022–23 EFL Cup and the 2022–23 EFL Trophy.

Players

Squad statistics

|}

Goals record

Disciplinary record

Transfers

In

Out

Loans in

Loans out

Pre-season and friendlies
On 18 May 2022, Crewe announced their finalised pre-season schedule with away trips to Nantwich Town, Macclesfield, Kidsgrove Athletic, Barnsley and Halesowen Town followed by a home game against West Bromwich Albion. A further home friendly with Rotherham United (for 23 July 2022) was also noted, though the match was later removed from the original press release. On 25 July 2022, a trip for an XI side to Whitchurch Alport was confirmed.

Mid-season
During the season, Crewe announced they would face Brentford B in a behind-closed-doors friendly.

Competitions

Overall record

League Two

League table

Results summary

Results by round

Matches

On 23 June, the league fixtures were announced.

FA Cup

The Alex were drawn at home to Leyton Orient in the first round and away to Barnsley in the second round.

EFL Cup

Crewe were drawn away to Grimsby Town in the first round.

EFL Trophy

On 20 June, the initial Group stage draw was made, grouping Crewe Alexandra with Bolton Wanderers and Tranmere Rovers. Three days later, Leeds United U21s joined Northern Group B.

References

Crewe Alexandra
Crewe Alexandra F.C. seasons